João Afonso Telo (or Teles) may refer to one of the following individuals:

 João Afonso Telo de Meneses, 2nd Lord of Albuquerque (died 1268), Portuguese nobleman, Lord of Albuquerque and alferes-mor of King Afonso III of Portugal
 João Afonso Telo, 1st Count of Barcelos (died 1304), also 4th Lord of Albuquerque
 João Afonso Telo, 4th Count of Barcelos (died 1381), Portuguese nobleman, also 1st Count of Ourém and 1st Count of Viana do Alentejo
 João Afonso Telo 2nd Count of Viana do Alentejo (died 1384), son of the 4th Count of Barcelos
 João Afonso Telo, 6th Count of Barcelos (died 1385), mayor of Lisbon, admiral of Portugal and brother of Queen Leonor Teles